François-Marie Treyve (1847–1906) was a French landscape gardener.

Life
Treyve originated from Trévoux. He was trained by his father-in-law, Joseph Marie. In the 1880s he was appointed Inspector of Parks and Gardens of Vichy. He took over from his father-in-law at Moulins in 1881 and set up the landscape gardening firm Établissements Treyve-Marie, in which he in turned trained his sons, Joseph and François. He transformed the old park at Vichy and created the Parc des Célestins. He was also the creator of many private parks across the Auvergne region, including those at:
 Château de Saint-Hubert at Chavenon
 Château de Pesteils at Polminhac
 Château de Montagne at Crevant-Laveine
 Château de Fougis at Thionne 
 Château de la Varenne at La Varenne.

He was summoned to the Russian court in 1891, from where he received horticultural commissions until 1896. In 1894 he published "Un voyage horticole au Caucase" ("A Horticultural Journey to the Caucasus").

Treyve was inspired by and indebted to the work of the great landscape gardener of the previous generation, Paul de Lavenne, Comte de Choulot.

References
 Le Comité des Parcs et Jardins d'Auvergne, 2007: Les Treyve: Une dynastie bourbonnaise de paysagistes (publication accompanying exhibition July–September 2007, Château du Riau, Villeneuve-sur-Allier)

1847 births
1906 deaths
People from Trévoux
French landscape architects
French gardeners